Idris Abubakar (1955–2002) was elected Senator for the Gombe South constituency of Gombe State, Nigeria at the start of the Nigerian Fourth Republic, running on the All People's Party (APP) platform. He took office on 29 May 1999.

Life
Abubakar was born on 13 November 1955 in Gombe State.
He became a barrister at law, and was principal partner of Idris Abubakar & Co with offices in Bauchi and Lagos states.
He was a member of the House of Representatives during the aborted Nigerian Third Republic (1992–1993).
After taking his seat in the Senate in June 1999, he was appointed to committees on Rules & Procedures, Solid Minerals, Banking & Currency, Water Resources, Privatization and Local & Foreign Debts (chairman).
He moved for replacement of Senator Evans Enwerem as Senate President in November 1999.
Later, Abubakar initiated the motion for impeachment of President Olusegun Obasanjo due to non-implementation of the Appropriation Act.

Abubakar died of diabetes on 10 December 2002 after an extended illness.

Death
He died on 11 December 2002.

References

Members of the Senate (Nigeria)
1955 births
2002 deaths
People from Gombe State
All People's Party (Nigeria) politicians
20th-century Nigerian politicians
21st-century Nigerian politicians